Tommy McCarthy (born 4 November 1990) is an Irish professional boxer who has held the European cruiserweight title since 2020. As an amateur he won a bronze medal for Ireland at the 2008 Youth World Championships.

Professional boxing career
McCarthy made his professional boxing debut against Rolandas Cesna on 24 May 2014. He won the fight by a third-round technical knockout. McCarthy fought thrice more in 2014 and won all three fights by stoppage: against Imantas Davidaitis on 21 June, against Dimitar Spaiyski on 4 October, and Martin Horak on 15 November.

McCarthy fought four more times in 2015. He first notched a sixth-round technical knockout of Jakub Wojcik on 20 February 2015. McCarthy next scored points victories against Courtney Fry on 1 August and Martin Szatmari on 5 December. His last of the year, against Vladimir Reznicek, came just a week after his victory over Szatmari. McCarthy won the fight by points.

McCarthy faced Jon-Lewis Dickinson on 28 May 2016, and won by unanimous decision. It was the first ten round bout of his career. McCarthy was next scheduled to face Matty Askin on 19 November 2016. He suffered the first loss of his professional career, as he lost by unanimous decision.

McCarthy rebounded from the first loss of his professional career with a first-round technical knockout of Peter Hegyes on 21 October 2017. McCarthy was then scheduled to face Blaise Mendouo on 18 November 2017. He won the fight on points.

McCarthy's sole fight of 2018 came against Kent Kauppinen on 17 November. He won the fight on points.

McCarthy was scheduled to face Jiri Svacina on 9 February 2019. He won the fight on points. McCarthy's four-fight winning streak earned McCarthy the chance to challenge the incumbent WBA Inter-continental Cruiserweight champion Richard Riakporhe on 2 March 2019. Riakporhe won the fight by a fourth-round technical knockout.

Following his loss to Riakporhe, McCarthy re-matched Jiri Svacina on 18 May 2019, and won by a third-round technical knockout. McCarthy was scheduled to face Francesco Cataldo on 11 July 2019 in Rome, which was his first fight outside of the British Isles. Cataldo retired from the fight at the end of the second round.

McCarthy was scheduled to fight the reigning WBC International cruiserweight champion Fabio Turchi on 11 October 2019. He won the fight by split decision.

McCarthy fought Bilal Laggoune for the European cruiserweight title on 31 October 2020. He won the fight by majority decision. McCarthy made the first defense of his European title against Alexandru Jur on 15 May 2021. He won the fight by a sixth-round knockout.

McCarthy was scheduled to fight Chris Billam-Smith on 31 July 2021. The fight was a defense of his European cruiserweight title, a challenge for Billam-Smith's Commonwealth title, and a fight for the vacant British cruiserweight title. The bout was set as the main event of a Matchroom Boxing card, which was broadcast by DAZN. McCarthy lost the fight by split decision, with scores of 116-112, 115-115 and 116-115. McCarthy expressed his surprise at the scorecards after the fight, stating: "“When I heard that score of 116-112 I just walked out of the ring in disgust... How could one of the judges have it eight rounds to four after a fight like that?". McCarthy was booked to face Billam-Smith in an immediate rematch on 16 April 2022. McCarthy lost the fight by an eight-round technical knockout.

Personal life
His cousin is the English musician Labrinth.

Professional boxing record

References

External links

1990 births
Living people
Irish male boxers
Cruiserweight boxers
Boxers from Belfast
European Boxing Union champions